Sterol is an organic compound with formula , whose molecule is derived from that of gonane by replacement of a hydrogen atom in position 3 by a hydroxyl group. It is therefore an alcohol of gonane. More generally, any compounds that contain the gonane structure, additional functional groups, and/or modified ring systems derived from gonane are called steroids. Therefore, sterols are a subgroup of the steroids. They occur naturally in most eukaryotes, including plants, animals, and fungi, and can also be  produced by some bacteria (however likely with different functions). The most familiar type of animal sterol is cholesterol, which is vital to cell membrane structure, and functions as a precursor to fat-soluble vitamins and steroid hormones. 

While technically alcohols, sterols are classified by biochemists as lipids (fats in the broader sense of the term).

Types 
Sterols of plants are called phytosterols and sterols of animals are called zoosterols. The most important zoosterol is cholesterol; notable phytosterols include campesterol, sitosterol, and stigmasterol. Ergosterol is a sterol present in the cell membrane of fungi, where it serves a role similar to cholesterol in animal cells.

Role in biochemistry 
Sterols and related compounds play essential roles in the physiology of eukaryotic organisms. For example, cholesterol forms part of the cellular membrane in animals, where it affects the cell membrane's fluidity and serves as secondary messenger in developmental signaling. In humans and other animals, corticosteroids such as cortisol act as signaling compounds in cellular communication and general metabolism.  Sterols are common components of human skin oils.

Phytosterols as a nutritional supplement 

Phytosterols, more commonly known as plant sterols, have been shown in clinical trials to block cholesterol absorption sites in the human intestine, thus helping to reduce cholesterol absorption in humans. They are currently approved by the U.S. Food and Drug Administration for use as a food supplement; however, there is some concern that they may block absorption not only of cholesterol, but of other important nutrients as well. At present, the American Heart Association has recommended that supplemental plant sterols be taken only by those diagnosed with elevated cholesterol, and has particularly recommended that they not be taken by pregnant women or nursing mothers.
Preliminary research has shown that phytosterols may have anticancer effects.

Chemical classification and structure 
Sterols are a subgroup of steroids with a hydroxyl group at the 3-position of the A-ring. They are amphipathic lipids synthesized from acetyl-coenzyme A via the HMG-CoA reductase pathway. The overall molecule is quite flat. The hydroxyl group on the A ring is polar. The rest of the aliphatic chain is non-polar.

See also 
 Cholesterol
 Ergosterol
 Hopanoids
 Hydroxysteroid
 Phytosterol 
 Steroids
 Zoosterol

References

Further reading

External links
 Sterols Cyberlipid.org